Google Panda is a major change to Google's search results ranking algorithm that was first released in February 2011. The change aimed to lower the rank of "low-quality sites" or "thin sites", in particular "content farms", and return higher-quality sites near the top of the search results.

CNET reported a surge in the rankings of news websites and social networking sites, and a drop in rankings for sites containing large amounts of advertising. This change reportedly affected the rankings of almost 12 percent of all search results. Soon after the Panda rollout, many websites, including Google's webmaster forum, became filled with complaints of scrapers/copyright infringers getting better rankings than sites with original content. At one point, Google publicly asked for data points to help detect scrapers better. In 2016, Matt Cutts, Google's head of webspam at the time of the Panda update, commented that "with Panda, Google took a big enough revenue hit via some partners that Google actually needed to disclose Panda as a material impact on an earnings call. But I believe it was the right decision to launch Panda, both for the long-term trust of our users and for a better ecosystem for publishers."

Google's Panda received several updates after the original rollout in February 2011, and their effect went global in April 2011. To help affected publishers, Google provided an advisory on its blog, thus giving some direction for self-evaluation of a website's quality. Google has provided a list of 23 bullet points on its blog answering the question of "What counts as a high-quality site?" that is supposed to help webmasters "step into Google's mindset". It has been incorporated in Google's core algorithm since 2015.

The name "Panda" comes from Google engineer Navneet Panda, who developed the technology that made it possible for Google to create and implement the algorithm.

Ranking factors
The Google Panda patent (patent 8,682,892), filed on September 28, 2012, was granted on March 25, 2014. The patent states that Google Panda creates a ratio with a site's inbound links and reference queries, search queries for the site's brand. That ratio is then used to create a sitewide modification factor. The sitewide modification factor is then used to create a modification factor for a page based upon a search query. If the page fails to meet a certain threshold, the modification factor is applied and, therefore, the page would rank lower in the search engine results page.

Google Panda affected the ranking of an entire site or a specific section, rather than just the individual pages on a site.

Updates
For the first two years, Google Panda's updates were rolled out about once a month, but Google stated in March 2013 that future updates would be integrated into the algorithm and would therefore be continuous and less noticeable.

Google released a "slow rollout" of Panda 4.2 starting on July 18, 2015.

See also
 Google Hummingbird, 2013
 Google penalty
 Google Penguin
 Spamdexing

References

Search engine optimization
Link analysis
Panda
Computer-related introductions in 2011